Yohansson Nascimento (born 25 September 1987) is an athlete and Paralympian from Brazil competing mainly in T45/46 sprint events. He was born without both his hands, and is classified T46. He started athletics in 2005.

Personal history
Nasciemento resides in Maceió and is married to Talita. He was named after former Formula One driver Stefan Johansson.

Athletics career
Nascimento competed in the 2008 Summer Paralympics in Beijing, China.  There, he won a silver medal in the men's 4 x 100 metre relay – T42-46 event, a bronze medal in the men's 100 metres – T46 event, finished fifth in the men's 200 metres – T46 event and went out in the first round of the men's 400 metres – T46 event.

At the 2012 Summer Paralympics, he won a gold medal in the men's 200 metres T46 event, breaking the T45 world record twice in the process. He won a silver medal in the T46 400m event, also in T45 world record time. He set a third T45 world record in his 100m heat but in the final he pulled up injured and fell to the track. His determination to cross the finish line regardless was selected Number 9 in the IPC's Top 50 Paralympic Moments of 2012.

References

External links
 

1987 births
Living people
Paralympic athletes of Brazil
Brazilian male sprinters
Paralympic gold medalists for Brazil
Paralympic silver medalists for Brazil
Paralympic bronze medalists for Brazil
Paralympic medalists in athletics (track and field)
Athletes (track and field) at the 2008 Summer Paralympics
Athletes (track and field) at the 2012 Summer Paralympics
Athletes (track and field) at the 2016 Summer Paralympics
Medalists at the 2008 Summer Paralympics
Medalists at the 2012 Summer Paralympics
Medalists at the 2016 Summer Paralympics
World record holders in Paralympic athletics
Medalists at the 2007 Parapan American Games
Medalists at the 2011 Parapan American Games
Medalists at the 2015 Parapan American Games
Medalists at the 2019 Parapan American Games
Athletes (track and field) at the 2020 Summer Paralympics
People from Maceió
Sportspeople from Alagoas
21st-century Brazilian people